Julio César Domínguez Juárez (born 8 November 1987), sometimes known as Cata, is a Mexican professional footballer who plays as a centre-back for Liga MX club Cruz Azul.

Club career

Cruz Azul
Isaac Mizrahi, impressed by Domínguez's performance in Cruz Azul's reserve team, allocated him for the first team in the final fixture of Clausura 2006. At the age of 18, Domínguez made his debut on 29 April 2006 in a home match against Pachuca which resulted in a 3–2 win for Cruz Azul.

Domínguez scored his first and second league goals on 14 November 2007 against Pachuca during the Apertura 2007 repechage.
 
He has remained with Cruz Azul, having originally started as a pure centre-back, Domínguez has proven his versatility with solid performances as a right-back.

International career

Youth
Domínguez first started with the under-20 national team. Domínguez was regarded as one of the brightest young defensive players that Mexico had.

Senior
Domínguez made his debut for the senior national team on 22 August 2007 in a friendly against Colombia. After a five-year absence from the national team, Mexico national team manager Miguel Herrera called him up for friendlies against the national football teams of Honduras and Panama in 2014. He would then be called up again against Netherlands and Belarus.

Domínguez was called up by Miguel Herrera for the 2015 Copa América, playing all 3 games against Ecuador, Chile and Bolivia.

Domínguez was called up again in 2018 during Ricardo Ferretti's interim of the national team but did not see any playing time.

Career statistics

International

Honours
Cruz Azul
Liga MX: Guardianes 2021
Copa MX: Clausura 2013, Apertura 2018
Campeón de Campeones: 2021
Supercopa de la Liga MX: 2022
Supercopa MX: 2019
CONCACAF Champions League: 2013–14
Leagues Cup: 2019

References

External links
 

1987 births
Living people
Footballers from Chiapas
Mexican footballers
Association football central defenders
Mexico under-20 international footballers
Mexico international footballers
2015 Copa América players
Cruz Azul footballers
Liga MX players